Zouhair Feddal Agharbi (born 23 December 1989) is a Moroccan professional footballer who plays for the Morocco national football team. Mainly a central defender, he can also appear as a left-back or defensive midfielder.

Club career

Early career
Born in Tétouan, Feddal started playing for Moghreb Tétouan at a young age, before moving with his family to Spain when at the age of six. In 2006, after representing FC Vilamalla and CF Peralada as a youth, he joined AS Monaco FC's youth setup, but moved back to Spain with CE Mataró in the following year.

Feddal joined UE Vilajuïga in the 2008 summer, making his senior debuts with the side in Tercera División. In July 2009 he signed a three-year deal with Segunda División B side Terrassa FC, but moved to CD Teruel in the fourth tier in January of the following year.

On 13 August 2010, Feddal signed for CD San Roque de Lepe in the third division, after being previously on trial. In May of the following year he moved to RCD Espanyol, being assigned to the reserves in the same level.

Feddal was released by the Pericos in June 2012, and subsequently signed for FUS de Rabat in September.

Parma
Feddal moved to Italian club Parma in August 2013, being subsequently loaned to Siena in Serie B. He picked no.11 shirt.

Feddal made his debut for the Bianconeri on 14 September 2013, starting in a 2–2 away draw against Juve Stabia. He made 27 appearances for the side before returning to his parent club.

On 2 August 2014, Feddal moved to Palermo in Serie A, with an option for the Sicilians to permanently sign him by the end of the season. He made his debut in the competition on 15 September, starting in a 2–1 loss at Hellas Verona.

Feddal's loan was cut short on 2 February 2015, and he made his Parma debut nine days later, playing the full 90 minutes in a 1–0 home defeat to Chievo Verona.

Levante

On 8 August 2015, Feddal returned to Spain, after agreeing to a three-year deal with La Liga side Levante UD. He made his debut in the category on 30 August, starting in a 0–0 away draw against UD Las Palmas.

Feddal scored his first goal in the main category of Spanish football on 22 November 2015, netting the second in a 3–0 away win against Sporting de Gijón. He was released in May 2016, after the club's relegation, due to a clause in his contract.

Alavés

On 16 July 2016, Feddal signed a three-year deal with fellow top-tier club Deportivo Alavés. On 11 March, he netted his first goal for the club against Málaga CF.

Betis
On 24 July of the following year, Feddal moved to fellow league team Real Betis after agreeing to a four-year deal. He scored his first goal in a 2–1 victory against RC Celta de Vigo.

Sporting CP
On 18 August 2020, Feddal joined Portuguese club Sporting CP on a two-year deal.

Valladolid
On 24 August 2022, free agent Feddal agreed to a one-year contract with Real Valladolid in the Spanish top tier. On 31 January 2023, after just eight league matches, he terminated his contract.

International career
Feddal represented Morocco at under-23 level at the 2012 Summer Olympics. He made his full squad debut on 14 November 2012, starting in a 1–0 friendly loss against Togo.

Career statistics

Club

International

Scores and results list Morocco's goal tally first, score column indicates score after each Feddal goal.

Honours
Alavés
Copa del Rey runner-up: 2016–17
Sporting CP
Primeira Liga: 2020–21
Taça da Liga: 2020–21, 2021–22 
Supertaça Cândido de Oliveira: 2021

Morocco U23
CAF U-23 Championship runner-up: 2011

Personal life
Feddal acquired a Spanish citizenship in January 2012.

References

External links

1989 births
Living people
People from Tétouan
Moroccan footballers
Association football defenders
La Liga players
Segunda División B players
Tercera División players
UE Vilajuïga footballers
Terrassa FC footballers
CD Teruel footballers
CD San Roque de Lepe footballers
RCD Espanyol B footballers
Levante UD footballers
Deportivo Alavés players
Real Betis players
Fath Union Sport players
Serie A players
Serie B players
Parma Calcio 1913 players
A.C.N. Siena 1904 players
Palermo F.C. players
Morocco international footballers
Footballers at the 2012 Summer Olympics
Moroccan expatriate footballers
Moroccan expatriate sportspeople in Spain
Expatriate footballers in Spain
Moroccan expatriate sportspeople in Italy
Expatriate footballers in Italy
Moroccan expatriate sportspeople in Portugal
Expatriate footballers in Portugal
CE Mataró players
Olympic footballers of Morocco
Moroccan emigrants to Spain
Primeira Liga players
Sporting CP footballers
Real Valladolid players